Joseph's Dream is a 1645 oil-on-canvas painting by Rembrandt. It was in the Königliche Schlöss in Berlin until 1830, when it moved to the city's Königliche Museum. It is now in the Gemaldegalerie, Berlin. It portrays Saint Joseph receiving the second of his dreams, warning him of the Massacre of the Innocents (Matthew 2: 13–15).

See also
 Joseph's Dream (Crespi), c. 1620s painting

References

Paintings based on the Gospels
1645 paintings
Paintings in the Gemäldegalerie, Berlin
Paintings by Rembrandt
Angels in art
Paintings of the Virgin Mary
Paintings of Saint Joseph
Nativity of Jesus in art